Jack Buck Award is an award named after former St. Louis broadcaster Jack Buck and presented by the Missouri Athletic Club. This award was established in 1987 and is presented to individuals in recognition of enthusiastic and dedicated support of sports in the city of St. Louis, Missouri.

 1987 – August A. Busch, Jr., former brewer, prominent sportsman, and owner of the St. Louis Cardinals
 1988 – Ben Kerner, Bing Devine
 1989 – Joe Garagiola and Yogi Berra, national baseball figures and former catchers originally from St. Louis
 1990 – Robert Hyland
 1991 – Mike Shanahan, part-owner of the St. Louis Blues
 1992 – Ozzie Smith, St. Louis Cardinal Hall of Famer
 1993 – Michael Roarty, Anheuser-Busch marketing executive
 1994 – Stan Musial, St. Louis Cardinal Hall of Famer
 1995 – Thomas Eagleton, United States Senator from Missouri
 1996 – Bill DeWitt, Fred Hanser, Drew Baur, St. Louis Cardinals owners and executives
 1997 – Martin L. Mathews, co-founder the Mathews-Dickey Boys' Club
 1998 – Red Schoendienst, St. Louis Cardinal Hall of Famer
 1999 – Charles Nash
 2000 – Mr. and Mrs. Mike Jones, former St. Louis Rams who made the tackle that ended Super Bowl XXXIV
 2001 – Flint Fowler
 2002 – Walt Jocketty, St. Louis Cardinals general manager (1994-2007) 
 2003 – Jerry Clinton, boxing aficionado who helped St. Louis regain an NFL team
 2004 – Tony LaRussa, St. Louis Cardinal Hall of Famer
 2005 – Jay Randolph, sportscaster 
 2006 – St. Louis Cardinals
 2007 – John Davidson, St. Louis Blues president of hockey operations and former goaltender
 2008 – Kelly Chase, former St. Louis Blues player
 2010 – Ernie Hays, former St. Louis Cardinals organist
 2012 – Steven Jackson, former St. Louis Rams Pro Bowl running back
 2013 – Aeneas Williams, former St. Louis Rams All-Pro cornerback
 2015 – Dave Peacock, former president of Anheuser-Busch
 2017 - Tom Stillman, chairman of the St. Louis Blues
 2018 - Jim Crane, owner and chairman of the Houston Astros
 2019 – MLS4THELOU, owners of the St. Louis City SC MLS franchise

Jack Buck Sports Personality of the Year 

 1970 - Bob Gibson
 1971 - Joe Torre
 1972 - Al Onofrio
 1973 - Lou Brock
 1974 - Don Coryell
 1975 - Terry Metcalf
 1976 - Jim Bakken
 1977 - Ted Simmons
 1978 - Warren Powers
 1979 - Keith Hernandez
 1980 - Pat Tilley
 1981 - Mike Liut
 1982 - Whitey Herzog
 1983 - Roy Green
 1984 - Ozzie Smith
 1985 - Willie McGee
 1986 - Todd Worrell
 1987 - Rich Grawer
 1988 - Jackie Joyner-Kersee
 1989 - Pedro Guerrero
 1990 - Brett Hull and Hale Irwin
 1991 - Jimmy Connors
 1992 - Norm Stewart
 1993 - Curtis Joseph
 1994 - Charlie Spoonhour
 1995 - Brendan Shanahan
 1996 - Tony La Russa
 1997 - Dick Vermeil
 1998 - Mark McGwire
 1999 - Al MacInnis
 2000 - Kurt Warner
 2001 - Marshall Faulk
 2002 - Albert Pujols
 2003 - Isaac Bruce
 2004 - Scott Rolen
 2005 - Chris Carpenter
 2006 - Torry Holt
 2007 - Jason Isringhausen
 2008 - Gary Pinkel
 2009 - Adam Wainwright
 2010 - Sam Bradford
 2011 - Lance Berkman
 2012 - Matt Holliday
 2013 - Matt Carpenter
 2014 - T. J. Oshie
 2015 - Mike Matheny
 2016 - Vladimir Tarasenko
 2017 - Yadier Molina
 2018 - Miles Mikolas
 2019 - Craig Berube

References

American sports trophies and awards
Sports in St. Louis
Awards established in 1987